Mark Davis may refer to:

Entertainers
Mark Davis (talk show host), American radio talk show host
Mark Jonathan Davis (born 1965), American actor/singer and creator of Richard Cheese
Mark Davis, American bassist and founding member for the band Emmure
Mark Davis (actor) (born 1965), English adult film actor
Mark Davis (Canadian musician), Canadian alternative country and indie rock musician

Sports
Mark Davis (American football) (born 1954/1955), American principal owner of the NFL's Las Vegas Raiders and WNBA's Las Vegas Aces
Mark Davis (pitcher) (born 1960), American Major League Baseball player
Mark Davis (outfielder) (born 1964), American Major League Baseball player
Mark Davis (basketball, born 1960), former player in the Australian National Basketball League
Mark Davis (basketball, born 1973), American former National Basketball Association player
Mark Davis (basketball, born 1963), American former National Basketball Association player
Mark Davis (snooker player) (born 1972), English snooker player
Mark Davis (golfer) (born 1964), English golfer
Mark Davis (English cricketer) (born 1962), English cricketer, played for Somerset and Wiltshire
Mark Davis (South African cricketer) (born 1971), South African former cricketer, played for Northern Transvaal and then in England for MCC and Sussex
Mark Davis (fisherman) (born 1963), American bass fisher
Mark Davis (boxer) (born 1987), American lightweight boxer
Mark Davis (footballer) (born 1969), English footballer
Mark Davis (wrestler) (born 1990) Australian professional wrestler

Other
Mark Davis (journalist), Australian journalist for Dateline
Mark A. Davis (born 1966), North Carolina judge
Mark H. A. Davis (1945–2020), English mathematician
Mark Davis (Unicode) (born 1952), American co-founder and president of the Unicode Consortium
Mark Steven Davis (born 1962), U.S. federal judge
Mark E. Davis (born 1955), American professor of chemical engineering at the California Institute of Technology
Mark M. Davis (born 1952), American professor of immunology at Stanford University
Mark S. Davis, American trial lawyer based in Honolulu

See also
Mark Davies (disambiguation)
Mark Davis Pro Bass Challenge
Mark Davis' The Fishing Master